The Ethiopian Full Gospel Believers' Church is a Pentecostal Christian denomination in Ethiopia. The headquarters is in Addis Ababa.

History
The Ethiopian Full Gospel Believers' Church has its origins in a prayer conference held at the University of Addis Ababa in 1966. The church is officially founded in 1967. In 2015, it had 2,143 churches and 4,5 million members.

Beliefs 
The denomination has a Pentecostal confession of faith (with some Mennonite influence).

References

External links
 Official Website

Pentecostal denominations in Africa
Evangelicalism in Ethiopia
1967 establishments in Ethiopia